The trade and pilgrimage routes of Ghana are located in the Bono, Bono East, Ahafo, Savannah, North East, Northern, and Upper East Regions of northern Ghana.  The routes were used by Bono people, Mandé warriors, Islamic traders and missionaries.

Site description
The sites along the trade routes are typified by the Sudanic and Djenne style mosques that were influenced by the Islamic traders who frequented the routes in search of gold and slaves. Along the way they converted much of the population of the region to Islam which led to the construction of the mosques.  The mosques themselves are constructed of local timber and mud-brick (cow dung and soil), and require constant maintenance thus necessitating broad conservation efforts.

History
The trade routes were established as early as the 1st century AD following the introduction of the camel, but were most active from the Middle Ages onward.

World Heritage Status
This site was added to the UNESCO World Heritage Tentative List on January 17, 2000 in the Cultural category.

Notes

References
Trade Pilgrimage Routes of North-Western Ghana - UNESCO World Heritage Centre Retrieved 2009-03-04.
McKay, J. P., et al. (2006), A History of World Societies: 7th Edition, Macmillan. 

Trade routes
Pilgrimage routes
Ghanaian culture